Tvins is a Scandinavian shopping channel broadcasting 24 hours a day.

Shopping networks
Pan-Nordic television channels

References